Avalon station is a elevated light rail station on the C Line of the Los Angeles Metro Rail system. It is located in the median of Interstate 105 (Century Freeway), above Avalon Boulevard, after which the station is named, in the unincorporated neighborhood of Green Meadows.

The original name for the station was Avalon Blvd/I-105, but was later simplified to just Avalon.

Service

Station layout

Hours and frequency

Connections 
, the following connections are available:
 LADOT DASH: Watts
 the Link: Willowbrook Route A

References

South Los Angeles
C Line (Los Angeles Metro) stations
Railway stations in the United States opened in 1995
1995 establishments in California